The 1990 Austrian motorcycle Grand Prix was the sixth round of the 1990 Grand Prix motorcycle racing season. It took place on the weekend of 8–10 June 1990 at the Salzburgring.

500 cc race report
Eddie Lawson is still out, as is Wayne Gardner.

First turn, it’s Wayne Rainey, Mick Doohan, Sito Pons, Kevin Schwantz, Pierfrancesco Chili, Niall Mackenzie and Christian Sarron. Schwantz begins to get a small gap from Rainey and Doohan, then there's another gap to Chili.

Rainey begins to bridge the gap to Schwantz, leaving Doohan. Rainey catches and tries a draft pass, but Schwantz denies it on the brakes. Rainey claws his way to the lead, but on the uphill drag, the 160 bhp Suzuki seems more than a match for the Yamaha as Schwantz passes Rainey again.
On the last lap, Schwantz’ lead holds as he wins over Rainey and Doohan.

500cc classification

References

Austrian motorcycle Grand Prix
Austrian
Motorcycle Grand Prix